Dr Mohammed Helmy  (July 25, 1901, Khartoum – January 10, 1982, West-Berlin) was an Egyptian medical doctor who saved several Jews from Nazi persecution in Berlin during the Holocaust. He has been recognized as Righteous Among the Nations by Yad Vashem, the first Arab to be recognized as such.

Biography
Mohammed Helmy was born in Khartoum, Sudan to an Egyptian army major. He went to Berlin in 1922 to study medicine. He would go on to work as head of the urology department at the Robert Koch Hospital (later called ) after graduating and having been apprenticed by a Jewish professor of medicine, Prof. Georg Klemperer.

Extensively involved in Nazi policies, the hospital issued a wave of dismissals three months after the Nazis came to power in 1933, and would lose almost all its mid-level scientists. Helmy himself was not fired at the time but was discriminated against, and eventually relieved of his duties in 1938 on the grounds that he was a non-Aryan Hamite, according to Nazi racial theory. He was also banned from working in hospitals, and from marrying his German fiancée, Annie Ernst.

In September 1939, a law requiring citizens of "enemy states" to register with authorities was implemented. Shortly after, Arabs in Germany and territories annexed or occupied by the Nazis were arrested, jailed, and deported to the Wülzburg internment camp near Nuremberg. Egyptian detainees in the camp were to be exchanged for Germans detained in Egypt. On October 3, 1939, Helmy was arrested and detained for a month before being sent to Wülzburg, where he fell seriously ill. He was released alongside the rest of the Egyptian prisoners in December. In January 1940, Heinrich Himmler ordered the internment of all adult male Egyptian nationals, which led to an ill Helmy being arrested for a second time. The Egyptian embassy managed to secure Helmy's early release in 1940 due to his deteriorating condition, sparing him another year in the internment camp.

For over a year, Helmy was obliged to report to the police twice every day and provide proof every month that he was too ill to be resent to the internment camp. Conscripted to the practice of Dr. Johannes Wedekind in Charlottenburg, Helmy fabricated sick notes for foreign workers to help them return to their countries, and also for German citizens to help them avoid labor civil conscription, and obligatory military service.

In 1943, Helmy was summoned to the Prinz-Albrecht-Palais, the notorious Berlin headquarters of the SS. He was tasked with providing Muslim guests including the Grand Mufti of Jerusalem, Amin al-Husseini, with medical care.

When the Nazis began deporting Jews from Berlin, Helmy hid a friend, Anna Boros-Gutman, in a cabin he owned in the neighborhood of Buch for the entirety of the war. He managed to evade Gestapo interrogations, as authorities were well aware Helmy treated Jews. He also hid a number of Gutman's relatives from Nazi persecution with the help of Frieda Szturmann, also providing for them and attending to their medical needs.

Four of Boros-Gutman's relatives were able to evade deportation thanks to Helmy and Szturmann. They would go on to immigrate to the United States.

Helmy was eventually able to marry Annie Ernst, and lived the rest of his life in Berlin, where he died in 1982. Szturmann passed away two decades earlier in 1962.

Tribute
When letters sent by Anna Boros and her relatives shortly after the war on behalf of Helmy and Szturmann to the Berlin Senate were discovered in the Berlin archives, they were submitted to Yad Vashem's Righteous Among the Nations Department. On March 18, 2013, the Commission for the Designation of the Righteous decided to award Helmy and Szturmann the title of Righteous Among the Nations. Helmy was the first Arab to be receive the honor.

Nephews of Helmy were sought by Yad Vashem to present them with the honour awarded to Helmy; they were, however, hesitant to accept the award, citing hostile relations between Israel and Egypt. "We would be delighted if another country honoured him", they told German author Ronen Steinke who visited them. Eventually, four years after he was recognized as the first Arab Righteous Among the Nations, a relative named Prof. Nasser Kotby agreed to receive the certificate from the Israeli ambassador to Berlin, but at a ceremony in the German Foreign Ministry, not in the Israeli Embassy, due to the family's difficulty in receiving the honor directly from an Israeli institution.

The Israeli filmmaker Taliya Finkel was researching Helmy's story since 2014. At 2017 her film MOHAMED AND ANNA – IN PLAIN SIGHT was released in the Israeli TV channel Kan 11. Finkel had located and made contact with Helmy's nephew Dr. Nasser Kotby, who agreed to participate in a new film and to be the 1st Arab ever talks about the holocaust in a film. Finkel offered Dr Kotby to accept the Yad Vashem award in Berlin and Kotby agreed. He is the 1st Arab to ever receive the Righteous Among the Nations award in a ceremony that took place in October 27, 2018.

Literature 

 Ronen Steinke: Anna and Dr Helmy: How an Arab doctor saved a Jewish girl in Hitler's Berlin, Oxford University Press 2021

See also
 Arab rescue efforts during the Holocaust

References

External links
 Mohammed Helmy at Yad Vashem website
 Taliya Finkel in IMDb
 After a long wait, first Arab 'Righteous Among the Nations' gets recognition
 Israel's Yad Vashem honors first Arab as 'Righteous Among the Nations' for heroism during Holocaust

1901 births
1982 deaths
People from Khartoum
Egyptian Righteous Among the Nations
Muslim Righteous Among the Nations
Egyptian physicians
Egyptian expatriates in Germany
Egyptian expatriates in Sudan
Prisoners and detainees of Germany
People extradited from Germany
Robert Koch Institute people
20th-century Egyptian physicians